Kelly Brian Shoppach (pronounced SHOP-ick; born April 29, 1980) is an American former professional baseball catcher. He played in Major League Baseball (MLB) for the Boston Red Sox, Cleveland Indians, Tampa Bay Rays, New York Mets, Seattle Mariners and Pittsburgh Pirates.

High school career
Shoppach attended Brewer High School in White Settlement, Texas, and was a student and a letterman in baseball and football. In football, he played quarterback, running back and linebacker, was a three-time all-district selection and as a senior, he was named the district's most valuable player.

College career
Shoppach attended Baylor University, where he played three seasons of college baseball for the Baylor Bears baseball team. For the Bears, he hit .333 (168-for-505) with 26 home runs and 121 RBIs. He recorded a .993 career fielding percentage, with seven errors in 953 total chances. In 2000, he played collegiate summer baseball with the Harwich Mariners of the Cape Cod Baseball League.

Shoppach began his junior season in 2001 by being named the Most Outstanding Player of the Houston College Classic. He hit .397 with 12 home runs and 61 RBIs in 69 games for the season. He also posted a .998 fielding percentage with only one error in 406 chances. After the season, Shoppach received the Johnny Bench Award as the nation's top collegiate catcher.

In addition to being selected "Big 12 Player of the Year", Shoppach was named First Team All-America in 2001 by Baseball America, Baseball Weekly, Louisville Slugger/Collegiate Baseball and the National Collegiate Baseball Writers Association.

Career

Boston Red Sox
The Boston Red Sox selected Shoppach in the second round of the 2001 Major League Baseball Draft. In , playing for the Pawtucket Red Sox in the Class AAA International League, Shoppach appeared in a career-best 101 games behind the plate for Pawtucket and threw out 35 of 101 potential base stealers (34.7 percent) on his way to a spot on the International League's end-of-season All-Star Team. He also set a single-season home run record for Pawtucket catchers with 21 and also hit one as a designated hitter. His 22 homers matched his previous career total over two years and 208 games. Shoppach added career bests with 62 runs scored and a .461 slugging percentage.47 of his 93 hits (51 percent) went for extra bases.

On May 26, Shoppach was recalled from Pawtucket. He was hitless in 15 at-bats with seven strikeouts.

Cleveland Indians
On January 27, 2006, Shoppach was traded from the Red Sox to the Cleveland Indians, along with third base prospect Andy Marte, pitcher Guillermo Mota, a player to be named later, and cash considerations. The Indians in turn sent outfielder Coco Crisp, catcher Josh Bard, and pitcher David Riske to the Red Sox. The Indians received minor league pitcher Randy Newsom from the Red Sox to complete the trade.

He did better in 2006 after the trade. He went 27 for 110. On June 26, 2007, Shoppach hit a pinch-hit 3-run walk off home run to defeat the Oakland Athletics 8–5.

On July 30, 2008, Shoppach became the second American League player in history, and eighth player overall in Major League Baseball, to record five extra-base hits in a game. He had three doubles and two home runs (including a game-tying HR in the ninth inning) against the Detroit Tigers. He came to bat twice in extra innings with a chance to get a sixth extra-base hit, but he was intentionally walked in the 10th and struck out in the 12th inning. The Indians lost, 14–12, in 13 innings.

On April 16, 2009, Shoppach drove in the first-ever run at the new Yankee Stadium, his fourth-inning double driving in Ben Francisco.

Tampa Bay Rays

On December 1, 2009, Shoppach was traded from the Cleveland Indians to the Tampa Bay Rays for pitcher Mitch Talbot.

On July 26, 2010, Shoppach caught a no hitter thrown by Matt Garza of the Tampa Bay Rays.

In the 2011 offseason the Rays signed former Red Sox teammates Manny Ramirez and Johnny Damon.

On September 30, 2011, Shoppach, in the first game of the 2011 American League Division Series against the Texas Rangers, hit two home runs, accounting for 5 RBIs.

Return to Red Sox
On December 13, 2011 Shoppach signed a 1-year, $1.35 million contract with the Red Sox with up to $400K in incentives. He began serving as the backup to Jarrod Saltalamacchia, replacing retired Red Sox Captain Jason Varitek and allowing prospect Ryan Lavarnway to return to the AAA Pawtucket Red Sox to further his minor league development.

New York Mets
On August 14, 2012, Shoppach was traded from the Red Sox to the New York Mets for a player to be named later, later identified as Pedro Beato. On August 17 he had his first home run as a Met.

Seattle Mariners
Shoppach signed with the Seattle Mariners for 2013. The Mariners also signed former teammate from the Mets Jason Bay. He was designated for assignment on June 14 after Henry Blanco was signed. In 35 games with Seattle, Shoppach batted only a .196 batting average. He was given his release on June 20.

Washington Nationals
Shoppach signed a minor league contract with the Washington Nationals on July 3, 2013 and went to Triple-A Syracuse. He opted out of his contract and became a free agent July 31.

Pittsburgh Pirates
Shoppach signed a minor league contract with the Pittsburgh Pirates on August 12, 2013 and was assigned to Triple-A Indianapolis. He was released August 28.

Second stint with Indians
Shoppach signed a minor league contract with the Cleveland Indians on August 30, 2013. He became a free agent after the 2013 season.

Awards and highlights
Portland Sea Dogs player of the year
International League All-Star
Red Sox Minor League Defensive Player of the Month (April 2005)
2005 Pawtucket Red Sox Player of the Year
Led AL in Hit By Pitch (2009)
Caught Matt Garza's no hitter (July 26, 2010)
8th player to record five extra-base hits in a game (July 30, 2008)

References

External links

SoxProspects.com Bio
Minor League Splits and Situational Stats 

1980 births
Living people
Boston Red Sox players
Cleveland Indians players
Tampa Bay Rays players
New York Mets players
Seattle Mariners players
Major League Baseball catchers
Baylor Bears baseball players
Harwich Mariners players
Baseball players from Texas
People from Fort Worth, Texas
Sarasota Red Sox players
Portland Sea Dogs players
Pawtucket Red Sox players
Buffalo Bisons (minor league) players
Durham Bulls players
Syracuse Chiefs players
Indianapolis Indians players
Columbus Clippers players
All-American college baseball players